The 2004 North Queensland Cowboys season was the 10th in the club's history. Coached by Graham Murray and captained by Travis Norton, they competed in the NRL's 2004 Telstra Premiership. It was the first time the club had made the finals, finishing the regular season in 7th, falling one game short of the Grand Final.

Season summary

Milestones 
 Round 1: Rod Jensen, Travis Norton, Luke O'Donnell and Mitchell Sargent made their debuts for the club.
 Round 3: Chris Sheppard played his 50th game for the club.
 Round 7: Shane Tronc made his NRL debut.
 Round 8: Ty Williams played his 50th game for the club.
 Round 8: Josh Hannay played his 100th game for the club.
 Round 11: David Faiumu made his NRL debut.
 Round 14: Steve Southern made his NRL debut.
 Round 15: Matt Sing played his 50th game for the club.
 Round 19: Matthew Scott made his NRL debut.
 Round 19: Leigh McWilliams played his 50th game for the club.
 Finals Week 3: David Myles played his 50th game for the club.

Squad List

Squad Movement

2004 Gains

2004 Losses

Ladder

Fixtures

Regular season

Finals

Statistics 

Source:

Representatives 
The following players played a representative match in 2004.

Honours

League 
 Dally M Prop of the Year: Paul Rauhihi

Club 
 Player of the Year: Luke O'Donnell
 Players' Player: Paul Rauhihi
 Club Person of the Year: Dave Roberts

Feeder Clubs

Queensland Cup 
  North Queensland Young Guns - 7th, missed finals

References 

North Queensland Cowboys seasons
North Queensland Cowboys season